Branno may refer to:
Brännö, an island in Sweden
Branno, Kuyavian-Pomeranian Voivodeship (north-central Poland)
Branno, Greater Poland Voivodeship (west-central Poland)
Harla Branno, fictional character in Foundation's Edge by Isaac Asimov